"FF.SS." – Cioè: "...che mi hai portato a fare sopra a Posillipo se non mi vuoi più bene?" is a 1983 Italian film directed by Renzo Arbore, starring Roberto Benigni, Renzo Arbore and Pietra Montecorvino.

Plot
The film begins with Renzo Arbore and Luciano De Crescenzo driving in Rome, while discussing an original idea for a new movie. They pass under the window of real-life filmmaker Federico Fellini, who is writing a screenplay entitled F.F.S.S (Federico Fellini Sud Story). A wind causes the screenplay to fall to the road below, and the two pick it up and decide to use Fellini's ideas themselves.

Renzo Arbore plays Onliù Caporetto, a manager from Irpinia trying to bring success to Lucia Canaria (Pietra Montecorvino). While travelling across Italy, they become involved in TV commercial in Milan, then go to Rome looking for a recommendation to work in RAI. Eventually they encounter Sceicco Beige (Roberto Benigni), a music celebrity. They participate in the Festival di Sanremo 1983, where Raffaella Carrà sings Soli sulla luna and Ahi.

Celebrity cameos
The film includes many Italian celebrities; apart the already said Arbore, De Crescenzo and Benigni, there are also appearances by Pippo Baudo, Isabella Biagini, Gianni Boncompagni, Dino Cassio, Alfredo Cerruti, Maurizio Costanzo, Riccardo Pazzaglia, Lory del Santo, Gerardo Gargiulo, Isaac George, Cesare Gigli, Renato Guttuso, Andy Luotto, Nando Martellini, Andrea Giordana, Sandra Milo, Severino Gazzelloni, Gianni Minà, Domenico Modugno, Gaetano Cristiano Rossi, Gianni Morandi, Nando Murolo, Stella Pende, Gigi Proietti, Teodoro Ricci, Bobby Solo, Massimo Troisi, Vasco Rossi, Luciana Turina, Claudio Villa, Isabel Russinova, Martufello, Mario Marenco, Sergio Japino and Gepy & Gepy

Political allusions

During the movie there are references to the politics of the period in which the film is set. It includes allusions to Bettino Craxi, Giulio Andreotti and Ciriaco De Mita. Also De Mita is from Nusco, province of Avellino, the same town of the character Onliù Caporetto.

References

External links

1983 films
Italian comedy films
Films directed by Renzo Arbore
Metafictional works
1980s Italian films